The 1990–91 Division 1 season was won by Marseille, with 55 points, for the third year in a row. A total of 20 clubs competed in the league. Bordeaux, Brest and Nice were all administratively relegated to Division 2 due to financial difficulties at the end of the season despite all finishing above the relegation zone.

Participating teams

 AJ Auxerre
 FC Girondins de Bordeaux
 Stade Brestois 29
 Stade Malherbe Caen
 AS Cannes
 Lille OSC
 Olympique Lyonnais
 Olympique de Marseille
 FC Metz
 AS Monaco FC
 Montpellier HSC
 AS Nancy
 FC Nantes Atlantique
 OGC Nice
 Paris Saint-Germain F.C.
 Stade Rennais
 AS Saint-Etienne
 FC Sochaux-Montbéliard
 Sporting Toulon Var
 Toulouse FC

League table

Promoted from Division 2, who will play in 1991–92 French Division 1 season
 Le Havre AC: Champion of Division 2, winner of Division 2 group B
 Nîmes Olympique: Runner-up, winner of Division 2 group A
 Lens:Third place, winner of barrages.

Results

Statistics

Top goalscorers

References

 Division 1 season 1990-1991 at pari-et-gagne.com

Ligue 1 seasons
France
1